The Nemouridae are a family of stoneflies containing more than 700 described species, occurring primarily in the Holarctic region. Members of this family are commonly known as spring stoneflies or brown stoneflies. Fly fishermen often refer to these insects as tiny winter blacks.

Although these insects use a wide range of flowing-water habitats, they tend to be most prevalent in smaller streams. The nymphs are distinctive, being broad-bodied and bristly with divergent wing pads.

Genera
These 20 genera belong to the family Nemouridae:

 Amphinemura Ris, 1902
 Illiesonemoura Baumann, 1975
 Indonemoura Baumann, 1975
 Lednia Ricker, 1952
 Malenka Ricker, 1952
 Mesonemoura Baumann, 1975
 Nanonemoura Baumann & Fiala, 2001
 Nemoura Latreille, 1796
 Nemurella Kempny, 1898
 Ostrocerca Ricker, 1952
 Paranemoura Needham & Claassen, 1925
 Podmosta Ricker, 1952
 Prostoia Ricker, 1952
 Protonemura Kempny, 1898
 Shipsa Ricker, 1952
 Soyedina Ricker, 1952
 Sphaeronemoura Shimizu & Sivec, 2001
 Tominemoura Sivec & Stark, 2009
 Visoka Ricker, 1952
 Zapada Ricker, 1952

References

 
Plecoptera families